Luis Oacpicagigua or Luis of Sáric (died 1755) was a Pima Indian (Akimel O'odham) leader in the Spanish province of Sáric, now the far north of the Mexican state of Sonora. Oacpicagigua served as a provincial "Indian governor" and fought for the Spanish government against enemy tribes, but later rebelled against the Spanish in the 1751 Pima Revolt. The revolt failed in 1752, Oacpicagigua and his lieutenant Luis of Pitic were summoned for questioning and subsequently arrested, and Oacpicagigua died in Horcasitas jail in 1755.

References

Native American leaders
1755 deaths
18th-century Mexican people
Year of birth unknown
Prisoners who died in Spanish detention